27 Piscium is a binary star system in the zodiac constellation of Pisces. It is visible to the naked eye with an apparent visual magnitude of 4.88. The system is positioned near the ecliptic and so is subject to occultation by the Moon.

This star was found to be a double by American astronomer S. W. Burnham. By 2002, sufficient position data had been gathered that orbital motion could be demonstrated, and preliminary elements were determined. The system has an orbital period of 695 years and an eccentricity of 0.766. However, the orbital elements do not fully explain the radial velocity variations, which may indicate there is a brown dwarf companion.

At the age of around 710 million years, the primary, component A, is a first ascent giant star on the red giant branch with a stellar classification of G8 III, which means it is generating energy through hydrogen fusion along a shell surrounding an inert helium core. It has 2.4 times the mass of the Sun and has expanded to 10 times the Sun's radius. The star is radiating about 56 times the Sun's luminosity from its photosphere at an effective temperature of 5,014 K.

In 2012, the magnitude 8.9 companion, component B, was at an angular separation of 0.80 arcseconds along a position angle of 325°.

References

G-type giants
Binary stars
Brown dwarfs
Pisces (constellation)
Durchmusterung objects
Piscium, 027
224533
118209
9067